The speckled mourner (Laniocera rufescens) is a species of bird in the family Tityridae. It has traditionally been placed in the family Cotingidae, but evidence strongly suggest it is better placed in Tityridae, where it is now placed by the SACC. It is found in Belize, Colombia, Costa Rica, Ecuador, Guatemala, Honduras, Mexico, Nicaragua, and Panama. Its natural habitat is subtropical or tropical moist lowland forest.

Description
It has a rounded head and a narrow yellow ring round the eye. The upper parts are reddish-brown with some barring on the wings, and the underparts are a similar colour, often with darker scaling. Males have a tuft of yellow feathers on the breast, but this is usually kept concealed. The rufous mourner (Rhytipterna holerythra) has similar colouring but has a differently-shaped head, a narrower-based beak (it is an insect-eater) and lacks the breast and wing markings. Another bird with which it could be confused is the rufous piha (Lipaugus unirufus), but that has a broader-based beak as befits an omnivorous diet, and more uniform colouring, with no yellow .

This bird is of a retiring nature and seldom seen, but it makes its presence known with its clear, ringing song, a sequence of about a dozen repeated "Tleeyr, tleeyeei, tleeyeei, tleeyeei ...", sung from a low perch.

Distribution
The speckled mourner is found in Central America and northern South America, its range extending from Mexico to Panama, Belize, Colombia and Ecuador.

Ecology
Little is known of the breeding of this species. A generally solitary bird, it usually forages alone but it may join small groups of birds of mixed species. Its diet consists mainly of insects and other arthropods, small reptiles and fruit.

Status
The speckled mourner is a generally uncommon species, with Panama probably being the country where it is most common; it was at one time described as "one of the scarcest of Middle American birds", suggesting that its scarcity is not as a result of recent deforestation. The population trend is probably downwards as a result of habitat loss, but the International Union for Conservation of Nature considers that its range is wide enough and the bird populous enough for its conservation status to be classified as being of least concern".

References

speckled mourner
Birds of Central America
Birds of the Tumbes-Chocó-Magdalena
speckled mourner
speckled mourner
Taxonomy articles created by Polbot